Ṭhenphunga Sailo (1 January 1922 – 27 March 2015) was a Brigadier of the Indian Army, and the second and twice the Chief Minister of Mizoram, a state in northeast India. He was the creator of Mizoram People's Conference, one of the major political parties in Mizoram. He was a recipient of Ati Vishisht Seva Medal (AVSM) and Padma Shri for his humanitarian works during his military service, and Mizo Award for his lifetime achievements.

T. Sailo was the son of Vanchheuva, a Mizo chief of Ṭhuampui village at Lunglei district. He studied at Serkawn Middle English School, Shillong High School (in Meghalaya), and Serampore College in Calcutta (now Kolkata). He earned his certificate of Intermediate of Science (higher secondary level) from the University of Calcutta. He immediately joined the British Army to serve in World War II. Recruited as Second Lieutenant in 1942, he became the first military officer among the Mizo people. He retired with the rank Brigadier in 1974. By then his native state was ravaged by political insurgency, and he soon set to humanitarian works and established the Human Right Committee, which he developed into a recognized political party named People's Conference (later renamed the Mizo People's Conference) in 1975.

T. Sailo led his new party to victory in the Mizoram Legislative Assembly election in 1978, and he became the second Chief Minister. Re-election the next year also brought him the same victory and remained the Chief Minister till 1984. Though he was elected for MLA seat in the 1984 election, his party was overwhelmed by the Mizoram Congress party (under the Indian National Congress Party). He was appointed the Opposition Leader in the legislative assembly. He was subsequently elected in 1998 and 2008 but failed to uplift his party. He retired from politics in 2013, and at age 91 he was by then the oldest elected legislator.

Early life and education
T. Sailo was born to Mizo Chief Vancheuva and his wife Hrangvungi. He completed his elementary schooling from Serkawn Middle School in Lunglei, and was the topper in the Middle School Leaving Certificate examination under the Mizoram Board of School Education. He then went on to High School in Shillong from 1937 to 1940. He then went on to study Intermediate of Science (higher secondary education) in Serampore College in 1941. The next year he earned his certificate under the University of Calcutta.

Army career
At the height of World War II, T. Sailo joined the Indian Army, which was under the British Army, as a Second Lieutenant in 1942. He became the first military officer among the Mizo people. After the Independence of India, he was promoted to Lt Colonel in 1960, in 1963 he was again promoted to Colonel, and then in 1966 to Brigadier until his retirement in 1974.

Politics
After retiring from Army, T. Sailo created the Human Rights Committee in 1974 fighting for alleged Army excess against civilian's caught in the separatist conflict between the Indian Army and Mizo National Front. He submitted a memorandum containing 36 cases of atrocities by the Indian Army since 1 March 1966. To fight his cause in the political arena, he founded the People's Conference Party (later to be renamed Mizo People's Conference) on 17 April 1975. His party won the Mizoram Legislative Assembly election of 1978, and he became the second Chief Minister of Mizoram on 2 June 1978. Due to political unrest, his government was dissolved after six months in November, and the Union Territory was declared under President's Rule. In the next election in 1979, his party won again and he once again became the Chief Minister, the post he held for full term till 1984. In the 1984 election, although he was elected in his constituency, his party was defeated by the Indian National Congress Party led by Lal Thanhawla. He became the Opposition Leader.

His party felt a serious blow with the Mizoram Peace Accord of 1987, as the Mizo National Front emerged not only as a new political party, but also was offered the government as part of the peace negotiation. For a short while, he changed the party's name to Mizoram Janata Dal but renamed it to reflect its old name Mizoram People's Conference. In the government formed after the 1998 elections, he was part of the ruling coalition led by the Chief Minister Zoramthanga of the Mizo National Front. He was appointed Principal Adviser to the state government. His ministry has also initiated the Aizawl city extension project, Bairabi Dam which he alleged were never pursued by the successive governments.

T. Sailo was again elected in the 2008 election and as his last term as Member of the Legislative Assembly ended in January 2014, he retired. He announced his formal retirement at the assembly session on 24 July 2013. At age 92, he was allegedly the oldest elected member of any legislative body in the world.

Awards and honours

T. Sailo was given the military award Ati Vishisht Seva Medal (AVSM) during his service. He was awarded the Padma Shree in 1999 by the Government of India. In 2001 the Mizo Zirlai Pawl declared him as a corruption-free politician from their public poll. In April 2011, the then Governor of Mizoram, Lt. Gen. Madan Mohan Lakhera, awarded him the Mizo Award organised by the Vanglaini daily newspaper in Mizoram.

Personal life and death

T. Sailo married Thansiami, daughter of a Mizo folklorist P.S. Dahrawka, in 1946. They had three sons, Lalsangliana Sailo, Lalhmangaiha Sailo, and Lalrinliana Sailo; and a daughter Laldingliani Sailo. Though a son of an Indian Army officer, Lalsangliana joined the Mizo rebels, the Mizo National Army (later Mizo National Front), on the sly while studying graduate course at St. Edmund's College, Shillong, in 1966. He became one of the elite "Special Force" under Laldenga, leader of the MNA. Lalhmangaiha and Laldingliani both entered the Indian Revenue Service. After retirement Lalhmangaiha succeeded his father as President of the Mizoram People's Conference in 2010. He retired as Chief Commissioner of Income Tax.

Laldingliani Sailo, after retirement, served as Member, National Commission for Women (NCW) from 2013 to 2016. She is the only Mizo to have become Member of NCW. She earlier also served as Member, Delhi Commission for Women (DCW). The only woman from North East to have served in DCW.

Lalrinliana Sailo studied medicine (MBBS) and MS (Orthopaedic Surgery) from AIIMS and became Director General, Health Services, Government of Mizoram.

T. Sailo wrote an autobiography of his military life A Soldier's Story.

He had been suffering from lung problems and hypertension. On the morning of 27 March 2015, he had trouble breathing and was taken to the New Life Hospital. He was pronounced dead at 11:50 IST. His funeral was held the next day at noon and was interred at his private grave in his garden.
President Pranab Mukerjee and Prime Minister Narendra Modi sent messages of condolence.

References

1922 births
2015 deaths
People from Aizawl
Mizo people
Chief Ministers of Mizoram
British Indian Army officers
Indian Army personnel of World War II
Indian Army officers
People from Lunglei district
Senate of Serampore College (University) alumni
University of Calcutta alumni
Recipients of the Padma Shri in social work
20th-century Indian politicians
Mizoram MLAs 1978–1979
Mizoram MLAs 1998–2003